The 2018 Strade Bianche was a road cycling one-day race that took place on 3 March 2018 in Italy. It was the twelfth edition of the Strade Bianche and the fifth event of the 2018 UCI World Tour.

Tiesj Benoot took his first professional victory, after attacking from a chasing group to catch leaders Romain Bardet and Wout van Aert before dropping them in the final sector of dirt roads. Benoot soloed to victory by 39 seconds ahead of Bardet, who dropped van Aert in the final kilometre; van Aert, a three-time world elite cyclo-cross champion, ultimately completed the podium a further 19 seconds in arrears.

Teams
As the race was only added to the UCI World Tour calendar in 2017, all UCI WorldTeams were invited to the race, but not obligated to compete in the race. As it transpired, all eighteen WorldTeams elected to compete in the race, just like in 2017. Three UCI Professional Continental teams competed, completing the 21-team peloton.

Result

References

External links
 

Strade Bianche
Strade Bianche
Strade Bianche
Strade Bianche